The ammonium cation is a positively-charged polyatomic ion with the chemical formula  or . It is formed by the protonation of ammonia. Ammonium is also a general name for positively charged or protonated substituted amines and quaternary ammonium cations, where one or more hydrogen atoms are replaced by organic groups (indicated by R).

Acid–base properties

The ammonium ion is generated when ammonia, a weak base, reacts with Brønsted acids (proton donors):
H+ + NH3 -> [NH4]+
The ammonium ion is mildly acidic, reacting with Brønsted bases to return to the uncharged ammonia molecule:
[NH4]+ + B- -> HB + NH3
Thus, the treatment of concentrated solutions of ammonium salts with a strong base gives ammonia. When ammonia is dissolved in water, a tiny amount of it converts to ammonium ions:
H2O + NH3 <=> OH- + [NH4]+

The degree to which ammonia forms the ammonium ion depends on the pH of the solution. If the pH is low, the equilibrium shifts to the right: more ammonia molecules are converted into ammonium ions. If the pH is high (the concentration of hydrogen ions is low and hydroxide ions is high), the equilibrium shifts to the left: the hydroxide ion abstracts a proton from the ammonium ion, generating ammonia.

Formation of ammonium compounds can also occur in the vapor phase; for example, when ammonia vapor comes in contact with hydrogen chloride vapor, a white cloud of ammonium chloride forms, which eventually settles out as a solid in a thin white layer on surfaces.

Salts

Ammonium cation is found in a variety of salts such as ammonium carbonate, ammonium chloride, and ammonium nitrate. Most simple ammonium salts are very soluble in water. An exception is ammonium hexachloroplatinate, the formation of which was once used as a test for ammonium. The ammonium salts of nitrate and especially perchlorate are highly explosive, in these cases, ammonium is the reducing agent.

In an unusual process, ammonium ions form an amalgam. Such species are prepared by the addition of sodium amalgam to a solution of ammonium chloride. This amalgam eventually decomposes to release ammonia and hydrogen.

To find whether the ammonium ion is present in the salt, first, the salt is heated in presence of alkali hydroxide releasing a gas with a characteristic smell which of course is ammonia.

[NH4]+ + OH- ->[heat] NH3 + H2O

To further confirm ammonia it passed through a glass rod dipped in an HCl solution (hydrochloric acid) creating white dense fumes of ammonium chloride.

NH3_{(g)}{} + HCl_{(aq)} -> [NH4]Cl_{(s)}

Ammonia when passed through  (copper(II) sulfate) solution turns from blue to deep blue color forming Schweizer's reagent.

CuSO4_{(aq)}{} + 4 NH3_{(aq)}{} + 4 H2O -> [Cu(NH3)4(H2O)2](OH)2_{(aq)}{} + H2SO4_{(aq)}

Ammonia or ammonium ion when added to Nessler's reagent gives a brown color precipitate known as the iodide of Million's base in basic medium.

Ammonium ion when added to chloroplatinic acid gives a yellow precipitate.
H2[PtCl6]_{(aq)}{} + [NH4]+_{(aq)} -> [NH4]2[PtCl6]_{(s)}{} + 2 H+

Ammonium ion when added to sodium cobaltinitrite gives a yellow precipitate.
Na3[Co(NO2)6]_{(aq)}{} + 3 [NH4]+_{(aq)} -> [NH4]3[Co(NO2)6]_{(s)}{} + 3 Na+_{(aq)}

Ammonium ion gives a white precipitate when added to potassium bitartrate.
KC4H5O6_{(aq)}{} + [NH4]+_{(aq)} -> [NH4]C4H5O6_{(s)}{} + K+_{(aq)}

Structure and bonding

The lone electron pair on the nitrogen atom (N) in ammonia, represented as a line above the N, forms the bond with a proton. After that, all four N–H bonds are equivalent, being polar covalent bonds. The ion has a tetrahedral structure and is isoelectronic with methane and the borohydride anion. In terms of size, the ammonium cation (rionic = 175 pm) resembles the caesium cation (rionic = 183 pm).

Organic ions

The hydrogen atoms in the ammonium ion can be substituted with an alkyl group or some other organic group to form a substituted ammonium ion (IUPAC nomenclature: aminium ion). Depending on the number of organic groups, the ammonium cation is called a primary, secondary, tertiary, or quaternary. Except the quaternary ammonium cations, the organic ammonium cations are weak acids.

An example of a reaction forming an ammonium ion is that between dimethylamine, and an acid to give the dimethylammonium cation, :

Quaternary ammonium cations have four organic groups attached to the nitrogen atom, they lack a hydrogen atom bonded to the nitrogen atom. These cations, such as the tetra-n-butylammonium cation, are sometimes used to replace sodium or potassium ions to increase the solubility of the associated anion in organic solvents. Primary, secondary, and tertiary ammonium salts serve the same function but are less lipophilic. They are also used as phase-transfer catalysts and surfactants.

An unusual class of organic ammonium salts is derivatives of amine radical cations,  such as tris(4-bromophenyl)ammoniumyl hexachloroantimonate.

Biology

Ammonium ions are a waste product of the metabolism of animals. In fish and aquatic invertebrates, it is excreted directly into the water. In mammals, sharks, and amphibians, it is converted in the urea cycle to urea, because urea is less toxic and can be stored more efficiently. In birds, reptiles, and terrestrial snails, metabolic ammonium is converted into uric acid, which is solid and can therefore be excreted with minimal water loss.

Ammonium is an important source of nitrogen for many plant species, especially those growing on hypoxic soils. However, it is also toxic to most crop species and is rarely applied as a sole nitrogen source.

Metal
The ammonium ion has very similar properties to the heavier alkali metals cations and is often considered a close equivalent. Ammonium is expected to behave as a metal ( ions in a sea of electrons) at very high pressures, such as inside giant gas planets such as Uranus and Neptune.

Under normal conditions, ammonium does not exist as a pure metal but does as an amalgam (alloy with mercury).

See also

Ammonium transporter
f-ratio
Hydronium (H3O+)
Iminium
Nitrification
Onium compounds
The Magnificent Possession (Isaac Asimov short story) 
Ammonium radical(?) (NH4•)

References

Cations